James Holburn is the name of:

Sir James Holburn, 1st Baronet (died 1737), of the Holburn baronets
Sir James Holburn, 2nd Baronet (died  1758), of the Holburn baronets
James Holburn (editor), editor of The Herald

See also
James Holborne of Menstrie, Scottish soldier during the years of the English Civil War
Holburn (surname)